José de los Santos Mauricio Moreno (November 1, 1957 – September 6, 2019) was a Dominican Major League Baseball player.

Although Moreno played in 82 games in his major league career, he played no more than seven games in the field at any one position, and just 20 games in the field in all. Most of his appearances came as a pinch hitter, with some as a pinch runner as well.

Moreno died on September 6, 2019 at the age of 61.

References

External links
, or Retrosheet

1957 births
2019 deaths
Auburn Phillies players
Azucareros del Este players
California Angels players
Diablos Rojos del México players
Dominican Republic expatriate baseball players in Canada
Dominican Republic expatriate baseball players in the United States
Edmonton Trappers players
Hawaii Islanders players

Leones del Escogido players
Major League Baseball outfielders
Major League Baseball players from the Dominican Republic
Minor league baseball managers
New York Mets players
Oklahoma City 89ers players
Reading Phillies players
Rieleros de Aguascalientes players
San Diego Padres players
Spartanburg Phillies players
Spokane Indians players
Sportspeople from Santo Domingo
Tidewater Tides players